I Dig Dancers is an album  Quincy Jones that was released by Mercury with performances recorded in Paris and New York City.

Reception 

AllMusic awarded the album 3 stars.

Track listing 
 "Pleasingly Plump" (Quincy Jones) - 2:15
 "G'wan Train" (Patti Bown) - 6:20
 "Moonglow" (Will Hudson, Irving Mills, Eddie DeLange) - 2:47
 "Tone Poem" (Melba Liston) - 3:40
 "You Turned the Tables on Me" (Louis Alter, Sidney D. Mitchell) - 2:30
 "Chinese Checkers" (David Carr Glover) - 2:41
 "Love Is Here to Stay" (George Gershwin, Ira Gershwin) - 3:10
 "The Midnight Sun Will Never Set" (Quincy Jones, Henri Salvador, Dorcas Cochran) - 4:29
 "Trouble On My Mind" (Ray Noble) - 2:51
 "A Sunday Kind of Love" (Louis Prima, Barbara Belle, Anita Leonard, Stan Rhodes) - 2:32

Bonus tracks on CD reissue:
"Parisian Thoroughfare" (Bud Powell) - 3:50
 "Pleasingly Plump" [First Take] (Jones) - 2:29
 "G'wan Train" [Short Version] (Bown) - 3:00
 "Close Your Eyes" (Bernice Petkere) - 2:07
 "Blues from Free and Easy" (Harold Arlen, Johnny Mercer) - 2:00

Collective Personnel 
Quincy Jones - arranger, conductor
Benny Bailey, Freddie Hubbard, Lennie Johnson, Jerry Kail, Clyde Reasinger, Floyd Standifer, Clark Terry - trumpet
Wayne Andre, Curtis Fuller, Jimmy Cleveland, Quentin Jackson, Melba Liston, Åke Persson - trombone
Julius Watkins - French horn
Joe Lopes, Porter Kilbert, Phil Woods - alto saxophone
Budd Johnson, Oliver Nelson, Jerome Richardson - tenor saxophone
Sahib Shihab - baritone saxophone
Patti Bown - piano
Les Spann - guitar, flute
Buddy Catlett - bass
Joe Harris, Stu Martin - drums

References 

1960 albums
Mercury Records albums
Quincy Jones albums
Albums arranged by Quincy Jones
Albums produced by Hal Mooney